Josserand is an unincorporated community in Trinity County, Texas, United States. As of 2000, the community had a population of 29.

History
Josserand was founded in 1882 by Peter and Frank Josserand, who established a sawmill in the community. In 1887, a post office opened in the community, and by 1892 Josserand had 550 residents as well as schools and two churches. In 1909, the sawmill ceased operations, and the schools were consolidated with Groveton's schools in the 1930s; the post office closed in 1948.

References

Unincorporated communities in Trinity County, Texas
Unincorporated communities in Texas
Populated places established in 1882